Jean Marie Maurice Schérer or Maurice Henri Joseph Schérer, known as Éric Rohmer (21 March 192011 January 2010), was a French film director, film critic, journalist, novelist, screenwriter, and teacher.

Rohmer was the last of the post-World War II French New Wave directors to become established. He edited the influential film journal Cahiers du cinéma from 1957 to 1963, while most of his colleagues—among them Jean-Luc Godard and François Truffaut—were making the transition from critics to filmmakers and gaining international attention.

Rohmer gained international acclaim around 1969 when his film My Night at Maud's was nominated at the Academy Awards. He won the San Sebastián International Film Festival with Claire's Knee in 1971 and the Golden Lion at the Venice Film Festival for The Green Ray in 1986. Rohmer went on to receive the Venice Film Festival's Career Golden Lion in 2001.

After Rohmer's death in 2010, his obituary in The Daily Telegraph described him as "the most durable filmmaker of the French New Wave", outlasting his peers and "still making movies the public wanted to see" late in his career.

Early life
Rohmer was born Jean-Marie Maurice Schérer (or Maurice Henri Joseph Schérer) in Nancy (also listed as Tulle), Meurthe-et-Moselle department, Lorraine, France, the son of Mathilde (née Bucher) and Lucien Schérer. Rohmer was a Catholic. He was secretive about his private life and often gave different dates of birth to reporters. He fashioned his pseudonym from the names of two famous artists: actor and director Erich von Stroheim and writer Sax Rohmer, author of the Fu Manchu series. Rohmer was educated in Paris and received an advanced degree in history, though he seemed equally interested and learned in literature, philosophy, and theology.

Career as a journalist
Rohmer first worked as a teacher in Clermont-Ferrand. In the mid-1940s he quit his teaching job and moved to Paris, where he worked as a freelance journalist. In 1946 he published a novel, Elisabeth (AKA Les Vacances) under the pen name Gilbert Cordier. While living in Paris, Rohmer first began to attend screenings at Henri Langlois's Cinémathèque Française, where he first met and befriended Jean-Luc Godard, François Truffaut, Claude Chabrol, Jacques Rivette and other members of the French New Wave. Rohmer had never been very interested in film, preferring literature, but soon became an intense lover of films and about 1949 switched from journalism to film criticism. He wrote film reviews for such publications as Révue du Cinéma, Arts, Temps Modernes and La Parisienne.

In 1950, he co-founded the film magazine La Gazette du Cinéma with Rivette and Godard, but it was short-lived. In 1951 Rohmer joined the staff of André Bazin's newly founded film magazine Cahiers du Cinéma, of which he became the editor in 1956. There, Rohmer established himself as a critic with a distinctive voice; fellow Cahiers contributor and French New Wave filmmaker Luc Moullet later remarked that, unlike the more aggressive and personal writings of younger critics like Truffaut and Godard, Rohmer favored a rhetorical style that made extensive use of questions and rarely used the first person singular. Rohmer was known as more politically conservative than most of the Cahiers staff, and his opinions were highly influential on the magazine's direction while he was editor. Rohmer first published articles under his real name but began using "Éric Rohmer" in 1955 so that his family would not find out that he was involved in the film world, as they would have disapproved.

Rohmer's best-known article was "Le Celluloïd et le marbre" ("Celluloid and Marble", 1955), which examines the relationship between film and other arts. In the article, Rohmer writes that in an age of cultural self-consciousness, film is "the last refuge of poetry" and the only contemporary art form from which metaphor can still spring naturally and spontaneously.

In 1957 Rohmer and Claude Chabrol wrote Hitchcock (Paris: Éditions Universitaires, 1957), the earliest book-length study of Alfred Hitchcock. It focuses on Hitchcock's Catholic background and has been called "one of the most influential film books since the Second World War, casting new light on a filmmaker hitherto considered a mere entertainer". Hitchcock helped establish the auteur theory as a critical method and contributed to the reevaluation of the American cinema that was central to that method.

By 1963 Rohmer was becoming more at odds with some of the more radical left-wing critics at Cahiers du Cinéma. He continued to admire US films while many of the other left-wing critics had rejected them and were championing cinéma vérité and Marxist film criticism. Rohmer resigned that year and was succeeded by Rivette.

Film career

1950–1962: Shorts and early film career
In 1950 Rohmer made his first 16mm short film, Journal d'un scélérat. The film starred writer Paul Gégauff and was made with a borrowed camera. By 1951 Rohmer had a bigger budget provided by friends and shot the short film Présentation ou Charlotte et son steak. The 12-minute film was co-written by and starred Jean-Luc Godard. The film was not completed until 1961. In 1952 Rohmer began collaborating with Pierre Guilbaud on a one-hour short feature, Les Petites Filles modèles, but the film was never finished. In 1954 Rohmer made and acted in Bérénice, a 15-minute short based on a story by Edgar Allan Poe. In 1956 Rohmer directed, wrote, edited and starred in La Sonate à Kreutzer, a 50-minute film produced by Godard. In 1958 Rohmer made Véronique et son cancre, a 20-minute short produced by Chabrol.

Chabrol's company AJYM produced Rohmer's feature directorial debut, The Sign of Leo (Le Signe du lion) in 1959. In the film an American composer spends the month of August waiting for his inheritance while all his friends are on vacation and gradually becomes impoverished. It included music by Louis Sagver. The Sign of Leo was later recut and rescored by distributors when Chabrol was forced to sell his production company, and Rohmer disowned the recut version. In 1962 Rohmer and Barbet Schroeder co-founded the production company Les Films du Losange (they were later joined by Pierre Coltrell in the late 1960s). Les Films du Losange produced all of Rohmer's work (except his last three features produced by La Compagnie Eric Rohmer).

1962–1972: Six Moral Tales and television work
Rohmer's career began to gain momentum with his Six Moral Tales (Six contes moraux). Each of the films in the cycle follows the same story, inspired by F. W. Murnau's Sunrise: A Song of Two Humans (1927): a man, married or otherwise committed to a woman, is tempted by a second woman but eventually returns to the first.

For Rohmer, these stories' characters "like to bring their motives, the reasons for their actions, into the open, they try to analyze, they are not people who act without thinking about what they are doing. What matters is what they think about their behavior, rather than their behavior itself." The French word "moraliste" does not translate directly to the English "moralist" and has more to do with what someone thinks and feels. Rohmer cited the works of Blaise Pascal, Jean de La Bruyère, François de La Rochefoucauld and Stendhal as inspirations for the series. He clarified, "a moraliste is someone who is interested in the description of what goes on inside man. He’s concerned with states of mind and feelings." Regarding the repetition of a single storyline, he explained that it would allow him to explore six variations of the same theme. Plus, he stated, "I was determined to be inflexible and intractable, because if you persist in an idea it seems to me that in the end you do secure a following."

The first Moral Tale was The Bakery Girl of Monceau (1963). This 26-minute film portrays a young man, a college student, who sees a young woman in the street and spends days obsessively searching for her. He meets a second woman who works in a bakery and begins to flirt with her, but abandons her when he finally finds the first woman. Schroder starred as the young man and Bertrand Tavernier was the narrator. The second Moral Tale was Suzanne's Career (1963). This 60-minute film portrays a young student who is rejected by one woman and begins a romantic relationship with a second. The first and second Moral Tales were never theatrically released and Rohmer was disappointed by their poor technical quality. They were not well known until after the release of the other four.

In 1963 Les Films du Losange produced the New Wave omnibus film Six in Paris, of which Rohmer's short "Place de l'Etoile" was the centerpiece. After being driven out of his editor position at Cahiers, Rohmer began making short documentaries for French television. Between 1964 and 1966 Rohmer made 14 shorts for television through the Office de Radiodiffusion Télévision Française (ORTF) and Télévision Scolaire. These included episodes of Filmmakers of Our Time on Louis Lumiere and Carl Theodor Dreyer, educational films on Blaise Pascal and Stéphane Mallarmé, and documentaries on the Percival legend, the industrial revolution and female students in Paris. Rohmer later said that television taught him how to make "readable images". He later said, "When you show a film on TV, the framing goes to pieces, straight lines are warped...the way people stand and walk and move, the whole physical dimension...all this is lost. Personally I don't feel that TV is an intimate medium." In 1964 Rohmer made the 13-minute short film Nadja à Paris with cinematographer Nestor Almendros.

Rohmer and Schroder then sold the rights of two of their short films to French television in order to raise $60,000 to produce the feature film La Collectionneuse in 1967, the third Moral Tale. The film's budget went only to film stock and renting a house in St. Tropez as a set. Rohmer described it as a film about l'amour par désoeuvrement ("love from idleness"). La Collectionneuse won the Jury Grand Prix at the 17th Berlin International Film Festival and was praised by French film critics, though US film critics called it "boring".

The fourth Moral Tale was My Night at Maud's in 1969. The film was made with funds raised by Truffaut, who liked the script, and was initially intended to be the third Moral Tale. But because the film takes place on Christmas Eve, Rohmer wanted to shoot the film in December. Actor Jean-Louis Trintignant was not available so filming was delayed for a year. The film centers on Pascal's Wager and stars Trintignant, Françoise Fabian, Marie-Christine Barrault and Antoine Vitez. My Night at Maud's was Rohmer's first successful film both commercially and critically. It was screened and highly praised at the 1969 Cannes Film Festival and later won the Prix Max Ophüls. It was released in the US and praised by critics there as well. It eventually received Oscar nominations for Best Original Screenplay and Best Foreign Film. James Monaco wrote, "Here, for the first time the focus is clearly set on the ethical and existential question of choice. If it isn't clear within Maud who actually is making the wager and whether or not they win or lose, that only enlarges the idea of le pari ("the bet") into the encompassing metaphor that Rohmer wants for the entire series."

The fifth Moral Tale was Le genou de Claire (Claire's Knee, 1970). It won the Grand Prix at the San Sebastián International Film Festival, the Prix Louis Delluc and the Prix Méliès, and was a huge international success. Vincent Canby called it "something close to a perfect film." It was Rohmer's second film in color. Rohmer said, "the presence of the lake and the mountains is stronger in color than in black and white. It is a film I couldn't imagine in black and white. The color green seems to me essential in that film...This film would have no value to me in black and white."

The sixth and final Moral Tale was 1972's Love in the Afternoon (released as Chloe in the Afternoon in the US). Molly Haskell criticized the film for betraying the rest of the series by making a moral judgment of the main character and approving of his decision in the film.

Overall, Rohmer said he wanted the Six Moral Tales "to portray in film what seemed most alien to the medium, to express feelings buried deep in our consciousness. That's why they have to be narrated in the first person singular...The protagonist discusses himself and judges his actions. I film the process."

1972–1987: Adaptations and Comedies and Proverbs
Following the Moral Tales Rohmer wanted to make a less personal film and adapted a novella by Heinrich von Kleist, La Marquise d'O... in 1976. It was one of Rohmer's most critically acclaimed films, with many critics ranking it with My Night at Maud's and Claire's Knee. Rohmer stated that "It wasn't simply the action I was drawn to, but the text itself. I didn't want to translate it into images, or make a filmed equivalent. I wanted to use the text as if Kleist himself had put it directly on the screen, as if he were making a movie ... Kleist didn't copy me and I didn't copy him, but obviously there was an affinity."

In 1978 Rohmer made the Holy Grail legend film Perceval le Gallois, based on a 12th-century manuscript by Chrétien de Troyes. The film received mostly poor critical reviews. Tom Milne said that the film was "almost universally greeted as a disappointment, at best a whimsical exercise in the faux-naif in its attempt to capture the poetic simplicity of medieval faith, at worse an anticlimatic blunder" and that it was "rather like watching the animation of a medieval manuscript, with the text gravely read aloud while the images — cramped and crowded, coloured with jewelled brilliance, delighting the eye with bizarre perspectives — magnificently play the role traditionally assigned to marginal illuminations." In 1980 Rohmer made a film for television of his stage production of Kleist's play Catherine de Heilbronn, another work with a medieval setting.

Later in 1980 Rohmer embarked on a second series of films: the "Comedies and Proverbs" (Comédies et Proverbes), where each film was based on a proverb. The first "Comedy and proverb" was The Aviator's Wife, which was based on an idea that Rohmer had had since the mid-1940s. This was followed in 1981 with Le Beau Mariage (A Perfect Marriage), the second "Comedy and Proverb". Rohmer stated that "what interests me is to show how someone's imagination works. The fact that obsession can replace reality." In his review of the film, film critic Claude Baignères said that "Eric Rohmer is a virtuoso of the pen sketch...[He had not been] at ease with the paint tubes that Persival required, [but in this film he created] a tiny figurine whose every feature, every curl, every tone is aimed at revealing to us a state of soul and of heart." Raphael Bassan said that "the filmmaker fails to achieve in these dialogues the flexibility, the textual freedom of The Aviator's Wife. A Perfect Marriage is only a variation on the spiritual states of the petty bourgeoise who go on and on forever about the legitimacy of certain institutions or beliefs confronted by problems of the emotions. Quite simply, this is a minor variation on this central Rohmerian theme."

The third "Comedy and proverb" was Pauline at the Beach in 1983. It won the Silver Bear for Best Director at the 33rd Berlin International Film Festival. It was based on an idea that Rohmer had in the 1950s, originally intended for Brigitte Bardot. Rohmer often made films that he had been working on for many years and stated "I can't say 'I make one film, then after that film I look for a subject and write on that subject...then I shoot.' Not at all...these are films that are drawn from one evolving mass, films that have been in my head for a long time and that I think about simultaneously."

The fourth "Comedy and Proverb" was Full Moon in Paris in 1984. The film's proverb was invented by Rohmer himself: "The one who has two wives loses his soul, the one who has two houses loses his mind." The film's cinematographer Renato Berta called it "one of the most luxurious films ever made" because of the high amount of preparation put into it. The film began with Rohmer and the actors discussing their roles and reading from the film's scenario while tape recording the rehearsals. Rohmer then re-wrote the script based on these sessions and shot the film on Super 8mm as a dress rehearsal. When the film was finally shot, Rohmer often used between two and three takes for each shot, and sometimes only one take. Alain Bergala and Alain Philippon have stated that "all the art of Eric Rohmer consists of creating on the set a veritable osmosis among himself, the actors and the technicians." Rohmer even encouraged actress Pascale Ogier to design sets for the film since her character is an interior decorator. Ogier later won the Best Actress award at the Venice Film Festival. Alain Philippon called the film "one of the most accomplished films that Rohmer has given us...and that if the film moves it is because of its own risk-taking."

The fifth "Comedy and Proverb" was The Green Ray in 1986. Rohmer explained that "I was struck by the naturalness of television interviews. You can say that here, nature is perfect. If you look for it, you find it because people forget the cameras." As was becoming his custom in pre-production, Rohmer gathered his cast together to discuss the project and their characters, but then allowed each actor to invent their own dialogue. Rohmer stated that lead actress Marie Rivière "is the one who called the shots, not only by what she said, but by the way she'd speak, the way she'd question people, and also by the questions her character evoked from the others." The film was shot chronologically and in 16mm so as to be "as inconspicuous as possible, to have Delphine blend into the crowd as a way, ultimately, of accentuating her isolation." Rohmer also instructed his cinematographer Sophie Maintigneux to keep technical aspects of the shoot to a minimum so as to not interrupt or distract the actors. The film's only major expense was a trip to the Canary Islands in order to film the green rays there. Rohmer chose to première the film on Canal Plus TV, a pay-TV station that paid $130,000 for the film, which was only one fifth of its budget. Rohmer stated that "Cinema here will survive only because of television. Without such an alliance we won't be able to afford French films."  The experiment paid off when the film was a theatrical hit after being released three days after its initial broadcast.  It won the Golden Lion and the FIPRESCI Prize at the 1986 Venice Film Festival.  It was mostly praised by film critics, although Alain Robbe-Grillet wrote an unfavorable review and stated "I didn't like it very much."

The Sixth "Comedy and Proverb" was Boyfriends and Girlfriends (L'Ami de mon amie) in 1987.

1987–2009: Tales of the Four Seasons and later film career
He followed these with a third series in the 1990s: Tales of the Four Seasons (Contes des quatre saisons). Conte d’automne or Autumn Tale was a critically acclaimed release in 1999 when Rohmer was 79. The previous titles of the series were A Tale of Springtime (1990), A Tale of Winter (1992), and A Summer's Tale (1996).

Beginning in the 2000s, Rohmer, in his eighties, returned to period drama with The Lady and the Duke and Triple Agent. The Lady and the Duke caused considerable controversy in France, where its negative portrayal of the French Revolution led some critics to label it monarchist propaganda.  Its innovative cinematic style and strong acting performances led it to be well received elsewhere.

In 2001, his life's work was recognised when he received the Golden Lion at the Venice Film Festival.

In 2007, Rohmer's final film, The Romance of Astrea and Celadon, was shown during the Venice Film Festival, at which he spoke of retiring.

Style
Rohmer's films concentrate on intelligent, articulate protagonists who frequently fail to own up to their desires. The contrast between what they say and what they do fuels much of the drama in his films. Gerard Legrand once said that "he is one of the rare filmmakers who is constantly inviting you to be intelligent, indeed, more intelligent than his (likable) characters." Rohmer considered filmmaking to be "closer to the novel—to a certain classical style of novel which the cinema is now taking over—than the other forms of entertainment, like the theater."

Rohmer saw the full-face closeup as a device that does not reflect how we see each other and avoided its use. He avoids extradiegetic music (not coming from onscreen sound sources), seeing it as a violation of the fourth wall. He has on occasion departed from the rule by inserting soundtrack music in places in The Green Ray (1986) (released as Summer in the United States). Rohmer also tends to spend considerable time in his films showing his characters going from place to place, walking, driving, bicycling or commuting on a train, engaging the viewer in the idea that part of the day of each individual involves quotidian travel.

Rohmer typically populates his films with people in their twenties and the settings are often on pleasant beaches and popular resorts, notably in La Collectionneuse (1967), Pauline at the Beach (1983), The Green Ray (1986) and A Summer's Tale (1996). These films are immersed in an environment of bright sunlight, blue skies, green grass, sandy beaches, and clear waters. He explained that "people sometimes ask me why most of the main characters in my films are young. I don't feel at ease with older people ... I can't get people older than forty to talk convincingly."

Rohmer preferred to use non-professional actors in his films. He usually held a large number of rehearsals before shooting and would shoot his films very quickly. He spent little time editing his films. He usually shot his films chronologically, and often shot scenes during the time of day in which they took place. He explained that "my films are based on meteorology. If I didn't call the weather service everyday, I couldn't make my films because they're shot according to the weather outside. My films are slaves to weather."

The director's characters engage in long conversations—mostly talking about man–woman relationships but also on mundane issues like trying to find a vacation spot. There are also occasional digressions by the characters on literature and philosophy as most of Rohmer's characters are middle class and university educated.

A Summer's Tale (1996) has most of the elements of a typical Rohmer film: no soundtrack music, no close-ups, a seaside resort, long conversations between beautiful young people (who are middle class and educated) and discussions involving the characters' interests from songwriting to ethnology.

Rohmer said he wanted to look at "thoughts rather than actions", dealing "less with what people do than what is going on in their minds while they are doing it."

Beginning in the late 1970s during the production of Perceval le Gallois Rohmer began to reduce the number of crew members on his films. He first dispensed with the script supervisor, then (controversially) cut out the assistant director, then all other assistants and technical managers until, by the time he shot The Green Ray in 1986, his crew consisted only of a camera operator and a sound engineer. Rohmer stated that "I even wonder if I could work in the usual conditions of filmmaking."

His style was famously criticised by Gene Hackman's character in the 1975 film Night Moves who describes viewing Rohmer's films as "kind of like watching paint dry".

Rohmer was a highly literary man. His films frequently refer to ideas and themes in plays and novels, such as references to Jules Verne (in The Green Ray), William Shakespeare (in A Winter's Tale) and Pascal's wager (in Ma nuit chez Maud).

Personal life and death
Rohmer's brother was the philosopher René Schérer. In 1957, Rohmer married Thérèse Barbet. The couple had two sons. The elder, René Monzat (b. 1958), is an author and investigative journalist at, most recently, Le Monde and Mediapart. His work focuses on the French far-right.

Rohmer was a devout Catholic and "ecological zealot". For years he had no telephone and refused to get into cars, which he called "immoral pollutors". For many years he was known to jog two miles to his office every morning. He was well known for his need for personal privacy and sometimes wore disguises, such as a false moustache at the New York premiere of one of his films. Rohmer's mother died without ever knowing that her son was a famous film director.

Rohmer died on the morning of 11 January 2010 at the age of 89 after a series of strokes. He had been admitted to hospital the previous week.

The former Culture Minister Jack Lang called Rohmer "one of the masters of French cinema". Director Thierry Fremaux called his work "unique".

Rohmer's grave is in district 13 of Montparnasse Cemetery.

At the 2010 César Awards, actor Fabrice Luchini presented a special tribute to Rohmer:
I'm going to read a remarkable text written by Jacques Fieschi, writer, director, creator of "the cinematographe", challenger of Les cahiers du cinéma, which recently published a special edition on Eric Rohmer. Truffaut once said he was one of the greatest directors of the 20th century, Godard was his brother, Chabrol admired him, Wenders couldn’t stop taking photos of him. Rohmer is a tremendous international star. The one and only French director who was in coherence with the money spent on his films and the money that his films made. I remember a phrase by Daniel Toscan Du Plantier the day Les Visiteurs opened, which eventually sold 15 million tickets: "Yes but there is this incredible film called L'arbre, le maire et la médiathèque that sold 100,000 tickets, which may sound ridiculous in comparison, but no, because but it was only playing in one theater for an entire year." A happy time for cinema when this kind of thing could happen. Rohmer. Here is a tribute from Jacques Fieschi: "We are all connected with the cinema, at least for a short time. The cinema has its economical laws, its artistic laws, a craft that once in a while rewards us or forgets us. Éric Rohmer seems to have escaped from this reality by inventing his own laws, his own rules of the game. One could say his own economy of the cinema that served his own purpose, which could skip the others, or to be more accurate that couldn't skip the audience with its originality. He had a very unique point of view on the different levels of language and on desire that is at work in the heart of each and every human being, on youth, on seasons, on literature, of course, and one could say on history. Éric Rohmer, this sensual intellectual, with his silhouette of a teacher and a walker. As an outsider he made luminous and candid films in which he deliberately forgot his perfect knowledge of the cinema in a very direct link with the beauty of the world." The text was by Jacques Fieschi and it was a tribute to Éric Rohmer. Thank you.

On 8 February 2010, the Cinémathèque Française held a special tribute to Rohmer that included a screening of Claire's Knee and a short video tribute to Rohmer by Jean-Luc Godard.

Awards and nominations

Filmography

Features

 The Sign of Leo (1962)
 The Collector (1967)
 My Night at Maud's (1969)
 Claire's Knee (1970)
 Love in the Afternoon (1972)
 The Marquise of O (1976)
 Perceval le Gallois (1978)
 Catherine de Heilbronn (1980, television film)
 The Aviator's Wife (1981)
 A Good Marriage (1982)
 Pauline at the Beach (1983)
 Full Moon in Paris (1984)
 The Green Ray (1986)
 Boyfriends and Girlfriends (1987)
 Four Adventures of Reinette and Mirabelle (1987)
 Le trio en mi bémol (1988)
 A Tale of Springtime (1990)
 A Tale of Winter (1992)
 The Tree, the Mayor and the Mediatheque (1993)
 Rendezvous in Paris (1995)
 A Summer's Tale (1996)
 Autumn Tale (1998)
 The Lady and the Duke (2001)
 Triple Agent (2004)
 The Romance of Astrea and Celadon (2007)

Notes

References

Bibliography
 de Baecque, Antoine and Herpe, Noël. Éric Rohmer. Stock. 2014. .
 Montero, José Francisco & Paredes, Israel. Imágenes de la Revolución. La inglesa y el duque/La commune (París, 1871). 2011. Shangrila Ediciones. https://web.archive.org/web/20140421082451/http://shangrilaedicionesblog.blogspot.com/2011/10/imagenes-de-la-revolucion-intertextos.html
 Eric Rohmer: Realist and Moralist (Midland: 22 June 1988)

External links
 
 extensive biography of Eric Rohmer
 
 Éric Rohmer — critical essay at Kamera
 Interview with 'The French Revolutionary - Eric Rohmer
 Tom Milne Obituary: Eric Rohmer, The Guardian, 11 January 2010
 Christopher Hawtree "Eric Rohmer: Prolific film-maker, critic and novelist whose pioneering work homed in on romantic tangles", The Independent, 13 January 2010
 "Eric Rohmer: director whose films included Le genou de Claire", The Times, 12 January 2010
 "On Eric Rohmer" in memoriam from n+1
 "The Grave of Eric Rohmer (Maurice Scherer), Montparnasse Cemetery, Paris."

 
1920 births
2010 deaths
20th-century French novelists
Burials at Montparnasse Cemetery
Cahiers du Cinéma editors
Directors of Golden Lion winners
French film critics
French film directors
French journalists
French male novelists
French male screenwriters
French people of German descent
French Roman Catholics
French screenwriters
German-language film directors
Lycée Henri-IV alumni
People from Tulle
Silver Bear for Best Director recipients